The Edward Miller House is a historic house at 36 Miller Stile Road in Quincy, Massachusetts.  This two-story wood-frame house was built in the 1830s by Edward Miller, a local veteran of the American Revolutionary War.  The house is a well-preserved Federal style structure, despite having experienced significant alterations c. 1912, when it was used as an inn, and in 1960, when it housed the offices of the South Shore Chamber of Commerce.

The house was listed on the National Register of Historic Places in 1990.

See also
National Register of Historic Places listings in Quincy, Massachusetts

References

Federal architecture in Massachusetts
Houses completed in 1830
Houses in Quincy, Massachusetts
National Register of Historic Places in Quincy, Massachusetts
1830 establishments in Massachusetts
Houses on the National Register of Historic Places in Norfolk County, Massachusetts